The 2018 general election was held in the U.S. state of Texas on November 6, 2018. All of Texas's executive officers were up for election as well as a United States Senate seat, and all of Texas's thirty-six seats in the United States House of Representatives. The Republican and Democratic Parties nominated their candidates by primaries held March 6, 2018.  Convention Parties nominated their candidates at a series of conventions.  County Conventions held March 17, 2018, District Conventions held March 24, 2018, and a State Convention held April 14, 2018. At the present time there is only one Convention Party in Texas, that is the Libertarian Party.  Other parties may seek to achieve ballot access.

Turnout in the November general election reached historic levels, rivaling turnout in a presidential election. While the Republican Party won every statewide position, the margin of victory was narrower than previous elections.

United States Senate

Democratic U.S. Representative Beto O'Rourke and Libertarian candidate Neal Dikeman challenged U.S. Senator Ted Cruz for re-election. Cruz narrowly defeated O'Rourke by 2.6%.

United States House of Representatives

All of Texas's thirty-six seats in the United States House of Representatives were up for election in 2018. No open seats changed hands, but two Republican incumbents lost to Democrats.

Governor

Incumbent governor Greg Abbott ran for a second term. He was first elected in 2014 after serving twelve years as Texas Attorney General, and he succeeded Rick Perry as governor.

Abbott won the March 20, 2018, Republican primary, while Lupe Valdez won the Democratic runoff against Andrew White, becoming the first Latina nominated by a major party for statewide office in Texas.

Libertarian Mark Tippetts also ran against Abbott. Tippetts defeated Kathie Glass, Patrick "Not Governor" Smith, and Kory Watkins at the party convention to earn his nomination.

Lieutenant Governor
On January 9, 2017, the day before the 85th Texas Legislature began its session, incumbent Republican Lieutenant Governor Dan Patrick announced he would run for re-election in 2018. He stated his early announcement was in order to dispel rumors of a primary challenge to Governor Greg Abbott or U.S. Senator Ted Cruz.

Republican primary

Candidates
Dan Patrick, incumbent lieutenant governor
 Scott Milder, former Rockwall city councilman

Results

Democratic primary

Candidates
 Mike Collier, businessman, finance Chair of the Texas Democratic Party, and nominee for Comptroller in 2014
 Michael Cooper, businessman, community leader, and pastor

Results

Libertarian state convention

Candidates
 Kerry Douglas McKennon

General election

Polling

Results

Attorney General

Incumbent Republican Attorney General Ken Paxton ran for re-election to a second term.

Republican primary

Candidates
Ken Paxton, incumbent Texas Attorney General

Results

Democratic primary

Candidates
Justin Nelson, partner at Susman Godfrey

Results

Libertarian state convention

Candidates
 Michael Ray Harris

General election

Endorsements

Polling

Results

Comptroller of Public Accounts
Incumbent Republican Comptroller Glenn Hegar ran for re-election to a second term.

Republican primary

Candidates
Glenn Hegar, incumbent comptroller

Results

Democratic primary

Candidates
 Joi Chevalier, business owner
 Tim Mahoney

Results

Libertarian state convention

Candidates
Ben Sanders

General election

Results

Commissioner of the General Land Office

Republican primary

Candidates
George P. Bush, incumbent Commissioner of the General Land Office
Davey Edwards, professional land surveyor
Jerry E. Patterson, former Commissioner of the General Land Office (2003–2015)
Rick Range, retired teacher and firefighter

Results

Democratic primary

Candidates
 Tex Morgan
 Miguel Suazo

Results

Libertarian state convention

Candidates
 Matt Piña

General election

Endorsements

Polling

Results

Commissioner of Agriculture
Incumbent Republican Commissioner Sid Miller ran for re-election to a second term.

Republican primary

Candidates
 Trey Blocker, lobbyist 
 Jim Hogan
Sid Miller, incumbent Commissioner of Agriculture

Results

Democratic primary

Candidates
 Kim Olson, retired Air Force Colonel and former member of the Weatherford Independent School District Board of Trustees

Results

Libertarian state convention

Candidates
 Richard Carpenter

General election

Results

Texas Railroad Commissioner
Incumbent Republican Commissioner Christi Craddick ran for re-election to a second six-year term.

Republican primary

Candidates
Christi Craddick, incumbent railroad commissioner
 Weston Martinez

Results

Democratic primary

Candidates
 Roman McAllen, historic preservation officer
 Chris Spellmon

Results

Libertarian state convention

Candidates
 Mike Wright

General election

Results

Supreme Court of Texas

Justice, Place 2 election

Republican primary

Candidates
Jimmy Blacklock, general counsel to Governor Greg Abbott

Results

Democratic primary

Candidates
Steven Kirkland, Harris County district judge

Results

General election

Results

Justice, Place 4 election

Republican primary

Candidates
John Devine, incumbent Associate Justice of the Texas Supreme Court

Democratic primary

Candidates
R.K. Sandill, Harris County district judge

Results

General election

Results

Justice, Place 6 election

Republican primary

Candidates
Jeff Brown, incumbent Associate Justice of the Texas Supreme Court

Results

Democratic primary

Candidates
Kathy Cheng, attorney

Results

General election

Results

Texas Court of Criminal Appeals

Presiding Judge election

Republican primary

Candidates
David Bridges, incumbent Associate Justice of the Fifth Court of Appeals of Texas
Sharon Keller, incumbent Presiding Judge of the Texas Court of Criminal Appeals

Results

Democratic primary

Candidates
Maria T. Jackson, Harris County district judge

Results

General election

Results

Judge, Place 7 election

Republican primary

Candidates
Barbara Parker Hervey, incumbent Judge of the Texas Criminal Court of Appeals

Results

Democratic primary

Candidates
Ramona Franklin, Harris County district judge

Results

General election

Results

Judge, Place 8

Republican primary

Candidates
Jay Brandon, Bexar County assistant district attorney
Michelle Slaughter, Galveston County district judge
Dib Waldrip, Comal County district judge

Results

General election

Results

Texas State Board of Education

Member, District 2

Republican primary

Democratic primary

General election

Member, District 3

Democratic primary

General election

Member, District 4

Democratic primary

General election

Member, District 7

Republican primary

Democratic primary

General election

Member, District 11

Republican primary

Democratic primary

General election

Member, District 12

Republican primary

Democratic primary

First round

Malone-Miller withdrew after the first round, eliminating the need for a runoff.

General election

Member, District 13

Republican primary

Democratic primary

General election

Texas Legislature
Every seat in the Texas House of Representatives and about half of the seats in the Texas Senate were up for election.

Texas Senate

Texas House of Representatives

Texas Courts of Appeals

Local trial courts

School boards

Municipal

Controversies

References

External links
Candidates at Vote Smart 
Candidates at Ballotpedia
Campaign finance at OpenSecrets

Official Lieutenant Governor campaign websites
Mike Collier (D) for Lt. Governor
Kerry McKinnon (L) for Lt. Governor
Dan Patrick (R) for Lt. Governor

Official Attorney General campaign websites
Michael Ray Harris (L) for Attorney General
Justin Nelson (D) for Attorney General
Ken Paxton (R) for Attorney General

Official Comptroller of Public Accounts campaign websites 
Joi Chevalier (D) for Comptroller
Glenn Hegar (R) for Comptroller
Ben Sanders (L) for Comptroller

Official Commissioner of the General Land Office campaign websites
George P. Bush (R) for Land Commissioner
Matt Piña (L) for Land Commissioner
Miguel Suazo (D) for Land Commissioner

Official Commissioner of Agriculture campaign websites
Sid Miller (R) for Agriculture Commissioner
Kim Olson (D) for Agriculture Commissioner

Official Railroad Commissioner campaign websites
Christi Craddick (R) for Railroad Commissioner
Roman McAllen (D) for Railroad Commissioner
Mike Wright (L) for Railroad Commissioner

Official Supreme Court of Texas, Place 2 campaign websites
Jimmy Blacklock (R) for Supreme Court
Steven Kirkland (D) for Supreme Court

Official Supreme Court of Texas, Place 4 campaign websites
John Devine (R) for Supreme Court
R.K. Sandill (D) for Supreme Court

Official Supreme Court of Texas, Place 6 campaign websites
Jeff Brown (R) for Supreme Court
Kathy Cheng (D) for Supreme Court

 
Texas